Wheatland Township is one of twenty-five townships in Bureau County, Illinois, USA. As of the 2010 census, its population was 142 and it contained 65 housing units. Wheatland Township was originally part of Milo Township, and became a separate township on an unknown date.

Geography

Unincorporated towns
 Lone Tree Corners
 Whitefield

Cemeteries
 Hunter
 Lone Tree

Demographics
As of the 2020 census there were 142 people, 30 households, and 30 families residing in the township. The racial makeup of the township was 97.18% White, 0.00% African American, 0.00% Native American, 0.00% Asian, 0.00% Pacific Islander, 0.00% from other races, and 2.82% from two or more races. Hispanic or Latino of any race were none of the population.

There were 30 households, out of which none had children under the age of 18 living with them, all were married couples living together, none had a female householder with no spouse present, and none were non-families. No households were made up of individuals. The average household size was 2.10 and the average family size was 2.10.

The township's age distribution consisted of 0.0% under the age of 18, 39.7% from 18 to 24, 0% from 25 to 44, 38.1% from 45 to 64, and 22.2% who were 65 years of age or older. The median age was 52.8 years. For every 100 females, there were 110.0 males. For every 100 females age 18 and over, there were 110.0 males.

School districts
 Bradford Community Unit School District 1
 Henry-Senachwine Community Unit School District 5
 Princeton Elementary School District 115 and Princeton High School District 500

Political districts
 Illinois's 18th congressional district
 State House District 73
 State Senate District 37

References
 
 US Census Bureau 2007 TIGER/Line Shapefiles
 US National Atlas

External links
 City-Data.com
 Illinois State Archives

Townships in Bureau County, Illinois
Populated places established in 1849
Townships in Illinois
1849 establishments in Illinois